Stealth disco (or SD) refers to the act of being videotaped dancing or rocking out behind or near someone who is doing something serious and does not notice.  This is sometimes referred to as stealthing (or SD-ing)  that person, a process which often concludes with emailing them the footage.  The term, if not the activity, was invented by employees at Chicago advertising agency Cramer-Krasselt, circa 2003.

After becoming the subject of its own website at stealthdisco.com in September 2003, the concept became an Internet phenomenon.

History
The original stealth disco page was created by employees of the Cramer-Krasselt ad agency in Chicago. Stealth disco, particularly the subgenre which involves posting the resulting videos online, was promoted by enthusiastic bloggers and other web surfers.

Creating and sharing these videos began as a form of humour and a way to lighten up an office.  It usually connotes a sense of bonding between the person being filmed and the person doing the filming.  From the original Stealth Disco site:
Working in advertising means plenty of long hours so you've got to find ways to have a little fun while you're here.  A sort of point of initiation to the agency, you know you've been accepted once you've been "stealthed."

However, stealthing is occasionally a means of covert revenge and provocation.  The younger age-bracket of stealth filmers' primary targets are usually universally known childhood enemies: teachers and peers outside of the stealth filmers' clique.  In these cases, stealthing is certainly not friendly initiation, but cruel fun at the expense of the person being filmed.

In December 2003, the original site was taken down after Cramer-Krasselt received a letter from Leo Stoller suggesting that their use of the word "stealth" infringed his trademark. The office manager said that Stoller's claim was without merit, but chose to forego an expensive legal battle.

As of 2005, the original video (and many that followed) can still be found online.  As of 2010, it was only available via public archives.

External links
 Original web site, circa October 2003, courtesy of the Internet Archive
 Original Stealth Disco video: YouTube, Windows Media Player format, QuickTime format

References
 O'Leary, Noreen. Cramer-Krasselt: This Chicago ad agency revels in strategic insights and Stealth Disco. Communication Arts September/October Interactive Annual 2003, page 62.
 Metafilter thread from September 2003
 Videos from PodCastCon 2006

Humour